Jean Haust (Verviers, 10 February 1868– Liège, 23 November 1946) was a Belgian academic, linguist and philologist. He was a professor at the University of Liège en became known for his publication of several dictionaries containing the Walloon dialect of Liège.

Honours 
 1932: Commander in the Order of Leopold.

Works
 Étymologies wallonnes et françaises (Liège and Paris, H. Vaillant-Carmanne and Édouard Champion, 1923)

References

1868 births
1946 deaths
Academic staff of the University of Liège
Linguists from Belgium
Belgian philologists
People from Verviers
Walloon movement activists